Nickelodeon Robot Wars is a game show that aired on Nickelodeon from August 25, 2002, to October 6, 2002. Hosted by Dave Aizer, the show was Nickelodeon's take on Robot Wars, the popular and long-running robot-fighting game show. The show was canceled after one season, and subsequently aired on Nick GAS.

The series of six shows was filmed at Shepperton Studios in England in January 2002, at the same time as the second season of Robot Wars: Extreme Warriors, which aired on TNN in the U.S. (now Paramount Network). Both shows featured American teams and robots flown to England for the filming.

Tournaments

Seven different tournaments took place over the six show series. Most of the tournaments aired within a single show, but a few spread out over multiple shows.

Adjustments and changes
The show featured robot competitors familiar to fans of the American series of Robot Wars, such as "Rosie The Riveter" and "The Revolutionist," but the robot operators were all children associated with the teams.

To suit the younger audience, a few adjustments and changes were made to the arena and House Robots.
 All flame hazards, including the flame pit, fire jets and Sgt Bash's flamethrower, were disabled.
 Sir Killalot was renamed "Sir K," a name he was commonly referred to in the official UK Robot Wars magazine.
 The Pit Release Bumper was moved further down the arena wall, closer to the bottom-right CPZ.
 The language used was changed, with rougher language being disallowed.

See also
 Robot Combat
 BattleBots

References
 

2002 American television series debuts
2002 American television series endings
2000s American children's game shows
2000s Nickelodeon original programming
Robot combat competitions
Robotics competitions
Television series about robots
Sports entertainment
American television shows featuring puppetry
Television shows filmed in England